Dragoon Spring is a spring in Cochise County, Arizona.

It is the site of burial for four Confederate Army soldiers who sought to invade the Territory of New Mexico.

References 

Geography of Cochise County, Arizona
Springs of Arizona